SS Lancing was a Norwegian whale factory ship, originally the British merchant ship Knight Errant. She passed through a number of owners, being named Rio Tiete, Omsk, Calanda, and Flackwell at different stages in her career.

Construction and early career
Knight Errant was built by Charles Connell and Company, Scotstoun and launched on 11 December 1897, being completed the following year. She entered service with Knight Steamship Company, Liverpool and sailed for them until being sold in 1913 to the European & Brazilian Shipping Company, of London. She was renamed Rio Tiete in 1914 and spent part of the First World War under the British flag. She was sold to Dobroflot in 1915, the Russian Volunteer Fleet Association, and was renamed Omsk. With the Russian Revolution in 1917 and the Russian exit from the war, Omsk was seized by the British Shipping Controller and operated on their behalf by the Royal Mail Steam Packet Company. She was then sold on again, in 1921, to the London & Foreign Maritime Trading Company, and then to the London Steamship & Trading Corporation. By now renamed Calanda, she spent only a few years on this service, and was sold once more to D L Flack & Son, London in 1923, being renamed Flackwell. Her final sale took place in 1925, when she was acquired by the Norwegian firm of Hvalfanger A/S Globus. They undertook her conversion to a whale factory ship and assigned her to be operated by Melsom & Melsom, 
Larvik under the name Lancing.

Sinking
In early April 1942, Lancing was sailing from Curaçao to New York City, under the command of Master Bjerkholt, with a cargo of 8,900 tons of fuel oil. Lancing was hit with a single torpedo at 10:52, killing a single crewman. The remainder of the crew abandoned ship as the Lancing sank off Buxton, Dare County, North Carolina. They were rescued by the American tanker .

The Lancing had a bunker capacity of 16,279 bbl for heavy fuel oil.  During 2011 to 2013, the shipwreck was evaluated by the National Oceanic and Atmospheric Administration for pollution potential. The wreck of the Lancing was listed on the National Register of Historic Places in 2013.

References

1897 ships
Ships built on the River Clyde
Steamships of Norway
Steamships of Russia
Steamships of the United Kingdom
World War I merchant ships of Russia
World War I merchant ships of the United Kingdom
Ships of Nortraship
Whaling ships
Maritime incidents in April 1942
Ships sunk by German submarines in World War II
World War II shipwrecks in the Atlantic Ocean
Shipwrecks of the Carolina coast
Archaeological sites on the National Register of Historic Places in North Carolina
Shipwrecks on the National Register of Historic Places in North Carolina
Buildings and structures in Dare County, North Carolina
National Register of Historic Places in Dare County, North Carolina
World War II on the National Register of Historic Places